The Universidad Autónoma Indígena de México (Autonomous Indigenous University of Mexico, UAIM) is a public institution of higher education in Mochicahui, El Fuerte Municipality, Sinaloa. It operates in Mochicahui, Los Mochis and Choix, as well as three extension centers.

History
The Universidad Autónoma Indígena de México (Autonomous Indigenous University of Mexico, UAIM) was founded on December 5, 2001. It evolved from the Institute of Anthropology, also based in Mochicahui and part of the Universidad de Occidente, which had been formed in 1982. It conducted archeological projects, and in the late 1990s, it separated, with Governor Juan S. Millán decreeing the creation of the UAIM as a separate entity. At that time, it had 1,000 students from 15 ethnic groups.

On May 9, 2019, XHMFS-FM 95.7 signed on, making the UAIM the first intercultural university in Mexico to own and operate a radio station.

Academic programs
UAIM offers undergraduate degrees at its Mochicahui, Los Mochis and Choix units, as well as at three extension centers. One degree is offered entirely online.

Mochicahui
Computational Systems Engineering
Quality Systems Engineering
Forestry Engineering
Social Community Psychology
Entrepreneurial Tourism
Rural Sociology
Accounting
Law

Los Mochis
Computational Systems Engineering
Quality Systems Engineering
Social Community Psychology
Rural Sociology
Accounting
Law

Choix
Computational Systems Engineering
Community Forestry Engineering
Alternative Tourism

Online
Law

Extension centers
Extensión Topolobampo
Quality Systems Engineering
Law
Extensión El Tajito, Guasave
Quality Systems Engineering
Community Business Management and Engineering
Social Community Psychology
Law
Extensión Jahuara II, Valle del Carrizo
Quality Systems Engineering
Community Business Management and Engineering
Social Community Psychology
Law

References

External links

Universities and colleges in Sinaloa
2001 establishments in Mexico